The United States Federal Budget for Fiscal Year 2001, was a spending request by President Bill Clinton to fund government operations for October 2000-September 2001. Figures shown in the spending request do not reflect the actual appropriations for Fiscal Year 2001, which must be authorized by Congress.

Total Receipts

(in billions of dollars)

Total Outlays
Outlays by budget function
(in millions)

References

External links
 Status of Appropriations Legislation for Fiscal Year 2001

2001
2001 in American politics
United States federal budget